István Kultsár (15 October 1900 – 9 March 1943) was a Hungarian long-distance runner, who was rated as one of the best Hungarian distance runners during the inter-war period. He competed in the men's 5000 metres at the 1924 Summer Olympics.

He was the national champion in the 5,000 metres in 1924, and three years later, he won the 7.5km race. Overal, Kultsár was a six-time national champion in cross-country running during the 1920s and the 1930s. As well as competing in sport, he was a noted expert in the field and became a chief editor of Nemzeti Sport.

References

External links
 

1900 births
1943 deaths
Athletes (track and field) at the 1924 Summer Olympics
Hungarian male long-distance runners
Olympic athletes of Hungary
Place of birth missing
20th-century Hungarian people